Counterpoint is the third album by Jason Webley, released in 2002.

Track listing
"Southern Cross" - 6:16
"Broken Cup" - 6:12
"Quite Contrary" - 3:08
"Then" - 4:44
"It's Not Time to Go Yet" - 5:59
"The Graveyard" - 6:38
"Northern Lights" - 5:17
"Drinking Song" - 3:57
"Counterpart" - 4:44
"Now" - 3:12
"Goodbye Forever Once Again" - 7:39
"Train Tracks" - 12:12

Personnel
Jason Webley - vocals (1-12), guitar (1-3, 7, 11), accordion (1-3, 5, 8, 12), bowls and bells (1, 7), marimba (3), piano (4, 7, 9), pump organ (4), shovel (6), Rhodes (7),  banjo (10) 
Jherek Bischoff - bass (1-4, 6, 7, 9-12)
Michael McQuilken - drums (1-3, 6, 8, 10-12), dishes (1) 
Harry Pierce - clarinet (2, 6, 8, 12), saxophone (2, 8), flute (12)
Josh Stewart - trumpet (3, 10, 12)
Andrea McCrady, M.D. - carillon (5)
Gary Luke - tuba (6, 8, 12)
Adam McCollum and Fred Hawkinson - trombone (6)
John Schurman - trumpet (6)
Paulo Pereira - cello (6, 9)
Eyvind Kang - viola (6), violin (6)
Olli Klomp - cajon (7)
Reggie Watts - keyboard (10)
Greg Powers - trombone (10, 12)
Jon Hyde - pedal steel guitar (11)

References

 Jason Webley - Counterpoint

Jason Webley albums
2002 albums